Lesbian, gay, bisexual, transgender (LGBT) people in Vietnam face legal challenges not experienced by non-LGBT residents. From 2000, both male and female same-sex sexual activity are legal and are believed to never have been criminalized in Vietnamese history. However, same-sex couples and households headed by same-sex couples are ineligible for the legal protections available to opposite-sex couples. Vietnam provides limited anti-discrimination protections for transgender people. The right to change gender was officially legalized in Vietnam after the National Assembly passed an amendment to the Civil Code in 2015. In August 2022, the Ministry of Health formally adopted the Global LGBT Health Standard, affirming that same-sex attraction and being transgender are not mental health conditions. It also established guidelines against procedures to "cure" homosexuality.

Vietnam's first gay pride parade peacefully took place in Hanoi on 5 August 2012. In 2017, pride parades were held in around 35 other cities and provinces.

According to data from Vietnam Centre For Economic And Strategic Studies (VESS), the percentage of LGBT people in Vietnam in 2021 is estimated to be from 9% to 11% of the population.

History
While the majority of Vietnamese historical accounts up to the modern era are concerned with the patriarchal ideas of Confucianism, the presence of homosexual activities in Vietnam has been recorded for a long time. A supplemental text to the 15th-century Code of Hồng Đức mentioned the trial of two women who lived in the same house and had sex with one another while the husband of one of the women was away. However, there was no mention of their sexual act during the trial, and they were only charged with adultery. This absence of criticism agrees with the belief of many historians that same-sex sexual acts have never been criminalized in Vietnam, not even in the current Criminal Code. The Penal Code indicates that the age of consent is 16 years regardless of gender or sexual orientation.

Recognition of same-sex relationships

In July 2012, the Minister of Justice announced that the Government of Vietnam had started a consultation on whether to legalize same-sex marriage. In June 2013, the Ministry of Justice submitted a bill that would remove the ban on same-sex marriage from the Law on Marriage and Family and provide some rights to cohabiting same-sex couples. The National Assembly debated it in October 2013.

On 24 September 2013, the Government issued a decree abolishing the fines on same-sex marriages. The decree took effect on 11 November 2013.

In November 2013, the National Assembly approved a new constitution. Article 64 was repealed and replaced by article 36 which reads: "Men and women have the right to marry and divorce. Marriage must adhere to the principles of voluntariness, progressiveness, monogamy, equality and mutual respect between husband and wife".

On 27 May 2014, the National Assembly's Committee for Social Affairs removed provisions giving legal status and some rights to cohabiting same-sex couples from the bill submitted by the Ministry of Justice. The bill was approved by the National Assembly on 19 June 2014, and took effect on 1 January 2015. It states that while Vietnam allows symbolic same-sex weddings, same-sex couples are neither recognized nor protected under the law. It does not allow same-sex partnership either, although the issue has been open for discussion during many house meetings. Although Vietnam abolished its ban on same-sex marriage, the law has a very limited effect in practice. If not recognized by the state, such marriages will not be protected by law for matters such as personal and property rights. Jamie Gillen, a National University of Singapore sociology researcher, stated that Vietnam's relaxation of stance contrasts with Vietnam's neighbors such as Singapore. It is estimated that such relaxed policies will attract tourism revenue as Vietnam attempts to promote themselves as a tolerant and friendly society.

Transgender rights

In 2017, the Ministry of Health estimated that Vietnam's transgender population was at 270,000-300,000 people. In March 2019, a survey conducted by local transgender associations found there were nearly 500,000 transgender people in the country.

A 2018 study revealed that 67.5% of surveyed transgender people suffered psychological issues and that around 60% had attempted suicide, 23% of were "forced to have sex with others", 16% had suffered sexual violence, and 83% had experienced humiliation.

On November 24, 2015, Vietnam passed a landmark law by a vote of 282–84, enshrining rights for transgender people in a move, advocacy groups say, paves the way for sex reassignment surgery. Such operations were previously illegal, forcing people to travel to nearby Thailand for the surgery. The legislation allows those who have undergone sex reassignment to register under their preferred sex. The law went into effect in January 2017. However, for that law to be fully enforced, a further bill needs to be passed. This bill covers the requirements for gender change applicants and the requirements for those performing it. In November 2018, speaking at a transgender rights event, the Việt Nam Union of Science and Technology Associations and Nguyễn Huy Quang, head of the Department of Legislation at the Ministry of Health, announced that the National Assembly is expected to discuss the bill in 2020.

Military service
In Vietnam, individuals can voluntarily serve within the Armed Forces when 18 years old and above, regardless of sex or sexual orientation.

Conversion therapy ban
In August 2022, it was reported that within Vietnam - conversion therapy became legally banned as well as LGBT individuals "are not diseased" and should never be treated as such according to the Health Ministry.

Public opinion
In 2001, a survey found that 82% of Vietnamese believed homosexuality "is never acceptable".

In 2007, Ho Chi Minh City Pedagogical University conducted a poll of 300 pupils at three junior high and high schools and discovered that 80% of pupils answered "no" when asked, "Is homosexuality bad?"

A March 2014 poll indicated that 33.7% of Vietnamese supported same-sex marriage, whereas 53% were opposed.

An online survey carried out from December 2015 to January 2016 found that 45% of respondents supported the legalization of same-sex marriage, while 25% opposed it and 30% answered "don't know".

Living conditions

In 2000, crime journalist Bui Anh Tan's novel A World Without Women was the first fictional Vietnamese book to deal extensively with gay people. In 2007, the story was turned into a television series.

In 2002, the government-run media declared homosexuality to be a "social evil" comparable to prostitution, gambling and illegal drug use and promised that legislation would be forthcoming to allow the government to combat homosexuality and arrest same-sex couples. In November 2002, the Communist Youth Newspaper carried a story about homosexuality that stated "some people are born gay, just as some people are born left-handed".

On 29 November 2007, the first foreign same-sex wedding was held in Hanoi between a Japanese and an Irish national. The wedding raised much attention in the gay and lesbian community in Vietnam. 

In 2009, Pham Le Quynh Tram became the first transgender woman to be legally recognized by Vietnamese authorities as a woman. As such, she was allowed to redefine her sex from male to female and to legally change her name to Pham Le Quynh Tram. However, according to a report from the Huffington Post, her official recognition was apparently withdrawn in late January 2013.

In September 2010, Tuoi Tre Online, the internet edition of the Tuoi Tre newspaper, published a letter from an 18-year-old reader describing his hard time dealing with family after they found out he was gay. The letter received hundreds of supportive responses from other readers that led the website to conclude it with an interview with Dr. Huynh Van Son, Dean of Psychology, at the Ho Chi Minh City Pedagogical University. For the first time, a major state media agreed that "homosexuality is normal".

Another ceremonial same-sex wedding between two Vietnamese citizens, Quốc Khánh and Thành Lợi, was held in Haiphong in northern Vietnam in June 2018.

On 5 August 2012, Vietnam's first gay pride parade took place in Hanoi, with participants expressing support for equal marriage rights for LGBT individuals.

In 2013, Vietnamese filmer Dang Khoa, produced a sitcom entitled My Best Gay Friends. The series is published on YouTube as Vietnamese broadcasters were reluctant to air the episodes. Khoa wanted to create the show to debunk the caricature stereotypes of homosexuality.

Madam Phung's Last Journey (2014) is a documentary film about a transgender band directed by Tham Nguyen Thi. Another movie is Finding Phong (2015), directed by Tran Phuong Thao and Swann Dubus.

A 2015 study revealed that around 44% of Vietnamese LGBT students aged 14–22 faced stigma, discrimination and violence because of their identities. Another 2015 study conducted by UNESCO found that 19% of students perceived bullying against LGBT students as "harmless". 70% of Hanoi parents said they would not allow their children to talk to gay students, and some believed that conversion therapy could help "cure" LGBT children. A 2014 USAID report showed that 54% of LGBT students said their school was not safe, with many dropping out. Of those who experienced violence, one third said they thought about committing suicide, with half of those attempting it. 85% of transgender students stated they dropped out because of assault and bullying.

Former American Ambassador to Vietnam, Ted Osius, was openly gay and known for his support of LGBT rights in Vietnam, and attended several pride events with his husband.

From 18 September 2017 to 24 September 2017, Vietnam's Hanoi Pride took place for a fifth consecutive year. The event hosted thousands of people, compared to only about a hundred at the first pride parade. Irish drag queen Panti Bliss attended the event. The sixth Hanoi Pride took place in November 2018, and saw the participation of more than a 1,000 people. The parade uniquely involves supporters and participants peddling on their bikes to campaign for transgender rights and same-sex marriage in the country. Over 35 similar events are held each year throughout Vietnam, including in the cities of Haiphong, Thanh Hóa, Da Nang, Qui Nhơn, Nha Trang, Vũng Tàu, Ho Chi Minh City and Cần Thơ. The events were aired by several Vietnamese television channels, namely VTV4, VTV6 and VTV9.

HIV/AIDS
In 2006, the Government enacted legislation to protect citizens infected with HIV and people living with AIDS from discrimination, and health care is provided free to all Vietnamese citizens.

Summary table

See also 

 Human rights in Vietnam
 LGBT rights in Asia
 Recognition of same-sex unions in Vietnam
 Les (Vietnam)

Notes

References

External links 
 

 
Law of Vietnam